The men's triple jump at the 2011 IPC Athletics World Championships was held at the QEII Stadium on 22 and 26 January 2011.

Medalists

References
Complete Results Book from the 2011 IPC Athletics World Championships
Official site of the 2011 IPC Athletics World Championships

triple jump
Triple jump at the World Para Athletics Championships